Terrorism is a major social issue in the Philippines and it is linked to the Moro conflict and the communist rebellion. The country ranks in 16th place on the Global Terrorism Index's 2022 list of countries most affected by terrorism.

A common definition of terrorism is the systematic use or threatened use of violence to intimidate a population or government for political, religious, or ideological goals. 

Since the late 1960s, terrorism has become a major problem in the Philippines.  These terrorist attacks are often carried out by several Jihadist and militants groups with different ideologies and motives. Such acts of terrorism include Bombings, Domestic terrorism, Kidnapping, Drug trafficing, Extortion, Mass murder, Assassination and other types of attack. Terrorist groups like Abu Sayyaf, Bangsamoro Islamic Freedom Fighters, New People's Army and Jemaah Islamiyah mostly operates in the Southern Philippines. 

Following the September 11 attacks, the Philippines became the second front against terrorism.  During George W. Bush’s presidency in 2002, the U.S has sent foreign aid and American troops in the southern archipelago of the Philippines to assist in counterinsurgency operations and which began Operation Enduring Freedom in the Philippines. The Siege of Marawi ended in the deaths of several terrorist leaders and reduction of Islamic State presence in the Philippines.

Legal definition
Terrorism is a crime under the Human Security Act of 2007 which describes such acts as causing "widespread and extraordinary fear and panic among the populace". The first group to be officially listed as a terrorist organization under the law is the Abu Sayyaf on September 10, 2015, by the Basilan provincial court.

List of terrorist incidents in the Philippines
Since January 2000 radical Islamist groups and Islamist separatist forces in the Philippines have carried out over 40 major bombings against civilians and civilian property, mostly in the southern regions of the country around Mindanao, Basilan, Jolo and other nearby islands. Numerous bombings have also been carried out in and around Metro Manila, though several hundred kilometres from the conflict in the southern regions, due to its political importance. In the period from 2000 to 2007 attacks killed nearly 400 Filipino civilians and injured well over 1500 more, more casualties than caused by bombings and other attacks in Indonesia, Morocco, Spain, Turkey, or Britain during the same period.

Public transport and other gathering places, such as street markets, have been targets, however large-scale abductions and shootings have also been carried out by the groups, predominantly by Abu Sayyaf and the Rajah Solaiman Movement, two groups that had claimed responsibility for most of the attacks.

For brevity, the definition of terrorism used is drawn from the United Nations General Assembly condemnation:

1970s

1980s

1990s

2000s

2000

2001

2002

2003

2004

2005

2006

2007

2008

2009

2010s

2010

2011

2012

2013

2014

2015

2016

2017

2018

2019

See also
 Insurgency in the Philippines
 Moro conflict
 War on terror
 Philippines–United States relations

References

 
Philippines
Moro conflict
Philippines
Human rights abuses in the Philippines